Government College Laundi in Chhatarpur District (Madhya Pradesh) is the only college of Laundi city. It was established on 28 October 1983.

Faculties

Arts faculty
Hindi
English
Political science
Sociology
Economics and History

Science faculty

 Bachelor of Science

Biology group
Chemistry
Zoology
Botany

Math group
Chemistry
Physics
Higher maths

Computer
 Computer Science

Affiliations
From 28 November 1983 to 18 July 1995: A.P.S. Univ. Rewa.
From 19 July 1995 to present: Dr. H.S. Gour V.V. Sagar.
Affiliation from UGC: 18 December 1996.

Total area of the college

National Service Scheme (NSS)
Unit 1 (100 Student)

Library
The library has 9,688 books with 1,826 in its book bank. It subscribes to journals.

Other information

Teacher-guardian project 
This is running to keep an eye on overall development a student and for academic excellence  in college. Student can short their problems by the help of teacher guardian system  Guardians are informed regularly about their children's progress and other activities through the committee.

Ganv ki beti project 
Ganv ki beti project has initiated by higher education department of the state government. It was decided that every girl who got through first division will be awarded with Rs 500 per month or Rs 5,000 per annum. The criteria for benefit with this project are:
 
 Student must pass the higher secondary exam with first division from any rural school or urban school of Chhatarpur and it must verified from Nagar Panchayat or Janpat Panchayat.
 She should be native of village and verified by Sarpanch, Janpat Panchayat or Nagar Panchayat.
 She should be a regular student of higher education in Government College or Granted College.

Pratibha Kiran Yojana 
This has been initiated to provide the optimum opportunities for those intellectual students who live in under BPL by higher education department of MP Government.
 She must be a bona fide resident of MP
 Those students who are native of urban areas passes 12th class with first division living under BPL line and those who pass their 12th while living in urban areas will be eligible.

Vivekanand career and employment guidance cell 
Information are provided by this cell about competitive exam guidance to youth entrepreneur and training to get a job for students. Many general and computerised information are available to them.

Book bank project 
Under this project books and stationery are provided to SC/ST categories students.

Citizen charter and right to information 
As per government rule, education information is on sign boards in colleges campus aiming of better transparency in administration. Students can easily get the free copies of documents by paying a fee fixed by the government.

Jan Bhagidari Samiti
Jan Bhagidari Samiti were formatted on 1997 by MP Government in Government Colleges. The chairperson of the committee is appointed by the government while the principal of the college acts as the secretary remain member appointed by the chairperson, which contain representatives from every selection of society. Collector SDM is mention as deputy chairperson. Constructions, new curriculum and professional curriculum are being running on self-finance basis by the Jan Bhagidari Samiti.

References
National Informatics Centre, India.
MP Government site for Government College, Laundi.

Chhatarpur district
Educational institutions established in 1983
Universities and colleges in Madhya Pradesh
1983 establishments in Madhya Pradesh